The Fly is a 1986 American science fiction horror film directed and co-written by David Cronenberg. Produced by Brooksfilms and distributed by 20th Century Fox, the film stars Jeff Goldblum, Geena Davis and John Getz. Loosely based on George Langelaan's 1957 short story of the same name and the 1958 film of the same name, The Fly tells of an eccentric scientist who, after one of his experiments goes wrong, slowly turns into a fly-hybrid creature. The score was composed by Howard Shore and the make-up effects were created by Chris Walas, along with makeup artist Stephan Dupuis.

The Fly was released on August 15, 1986, to massive acclaim by critics and audiences, with praise mainly regarding the special effects and Goldblum's performance. It grossed $60.6 million at the box office against its $9 million budget, becoming the largest commercial success of Cronenberg's career. Walas and Dupuis' work on the film resulted in their winning an Academy Award for Best Makeup, the only Oscar won by a film directed by Cronenberg. A sequel, directed by Walas, was released in 1989.

Plot 

Brilliant but eccentric scientist Seth Brundle meets science journalist Veronica "Ronnie" Quaife at a meet-the-press event held by Bartok Science Industries, the company funding his work. He takes her back to the laboratory of his warehouse home and asks her to exclusively document his invention: two pods that can teleport objects between them. While the "telepods" can transport inanimate objects perfectly, they are unable to teleport live tissue, as demonstrated when a baboon is turned inside out after being teleported.

As they experiment with the invention, Seth and Ronnie begin to form a relationship. Using two steaks, one a control and one teleported, Seth discovers that the machine is creating a synthetic version of biological material rather than the object itself. He reprograms the system to understand the makeup of living tissue and successfully teleports a second baboon. Ronnie departs before they can celebrate, and Seth worries that she is rekindling her relationship with her editor, Stathis Borans. She actually left to confront Stathis about a veiled threat, spurred by his jealousy of Seth, to publish the telepod story without her consent. While drunk, Seth teleports himself alone, unaware that a housefly had entered the transmitter pod with him. He emerges from the receiving pod, seemingly normal.

After Seth and Ronnie reconcile, Seth exhibits sugar cravings and increased strength, agility, stamina, and sexual potency, which he believes resulted from the teleportation "purifying" his body. Ronnie becomes increasingly concerned about Seth's deteriorating sanity, as well as strange, bristly hairs growing from a wound on his back and developing sores on his face. When she expresses her worries, Seth becomes aggressive, insisting that the process is beneficial. He tries to force Ronnie to undergo teleportation, but she refuses.

Seth goes to a bar and partakes in an arm-wrestling match, leaving his opponent with a compound fracture. He brings a woman, Tawny, back to the warehouse, where they have sex. After that, Seth tries to coerce her into teleporting. However, Ronnie intervenes, and Seth throws her out. When his fingernails begin falling off, he slowly realizes that Ronnie had been telling the truth. He re-runs the teleportation sequence and discovers that the computer, confused by the presence of two separate lifeforms in the sending pod, fused him with the fly at the molecular-genetic level.

Seth continues to deteriorate, losing body parts along with his human appearance. After several weeks, he reconnects with Ronnie and reveals he is slowly becoming a hybrid creature that is neither human nor insect, which he has nicknamed "Brundlefly." He has also begun vomiting digestive enzymes onto his food before eating and is able to cling to walls and ceilings. He also discovers that he is losing his human reason and compassion and is now being driven by primitive impulses he cannot control.

Seth installs a fusion program into the telepod computer, planning to dilute the fly genes in his body with human DNA. Ronnie discovers she is pregnant with Seth's baby and has a nightmare of giving birth to a giant maggot. She demands that Stathis persuade a doctor to perform an abortion in the middle of the night, but Seth overhears Ronnie's fears and abducts her before the procedure occurs. He begs her to carry the child to term, since it may be the last remnant of his humanity. Stathis breaks into Seth's lab with a shotgun, but Seth disables him using his corrosive vomit to destroy Stathis' hand and foot, stopping just short of vomiting acid onto his face when Ronnie screams at him to stop.

Seth reveals his final plan to Ronnie: he will use the telepods to fuse the two of them, along with the unborn child, into a single entity to become "the ultimate family." During a struggle, she accidentally tears off his jaw, which triggers his final transformation, shedding his decaying flesh to become a monstrous, insectoid-human creature.

Seth traps Ronnie in the first telepod, puts himself in the other, and begins the countdown. A weakened Stathis recovers his shotgun and severs the cables connecting Ronnie's telepod to the computer. Seth breaks halfway out of his own pod, but the fusion process activates, gruesomely amalgamating him with a chunk of the telepod. Seth crawls to Ronnie and places the shotgun barrel to his head, silently begging her to end his suffering. Looking on at the creature that was once Seth Brundle, she tearfully fires, killing him instantly. She falls to her knees in despair.

Cast 

 Jeff Goldblum as Seth Brundle
 Geena Davis as Veronica "Ronnie" Quaife
 John Getz as Stathis Borans
 Joy Boushel as Tawny
 Leslie Carlson as Dr. Brent Cheevers 
 George Chuvalo as Marky
 David Cronenberg as a Gynecologist

Production 

In the early 1980s, co-producer Kip Ohman approached screenwriter Charles Edward Pogue with the idea of remaking the classic science fiction horror film The Fly. Pogue began by reading George Langelaan's short story and then watching the original film, which he had never seen. Deciding that this was a project in which he was interested, he talked with producer Stuart Cornfeld about setting up the production, and Cornfeld very quickly agreed. The duo then pitched the idea to executives at 20th Century Fox and received an enthusiastic response, and Pogue was given money to write a first draft screenplay. He initially wrote an outline similar to that of Langelaan's story, but both he and Cornfeld thought that it would be better to rework the material to focus on a gradual metamorphosis instead of an instantaneous monster. However, when executives read the script, they were so unimpressed that they immediately withdrew from the project. After some negotiation, Cornfeld orchestrated a deal whereby Fox would agree to distribute the film if he could set up financing through another source.

The new producer was Mel Brooks;  the film was to be produced by his company, Brooksfilms. Cornfeld was a frequent collaborator and friend of Brooks. Together, they had produced David Lynch's film The Elephant Man. (Brooks would leave his name off the film's credits, to avoid confusing viewers who might expect "a Mel Brooks film" to be a comedy.) Cornfeld gave the script to Brooks, who liked it but felt that a different writer was needed. Pogue was then removed from the project, and Cornfeld hired Walon Green for a rewrite. However, Green's draft was not a step in the  desired direction, so Pogue was then sought to polish the material. At the same time, Brooks and Cornfeld were trying to find a suitable director. Their first choice was David Cronenberg, but he was working on Total Recall, an adaptation of the Philip K. Dick short story "We Can Remember It for You Wholesale", for Dino De Laurentiis, so he was unable to accept. Cornfeld decided on a young British director named Robert Bierman after seeing one of his short films. Bierman was flown to Los Angeles to meet with Pogue, and the film was in the very early stages of preproduction when tragedy struck: Bierman's family had been vacationing in South Africa, and his daughter was killed in an accident. Bierman boarded a plane to go to his family, and Brooks and Cornfeld waited for a month before approaching him about resuming work on the picture. Bierman told them that he was unable to start working so soon, and Brooks told him that he would wait three months and contact him again. At the end of the three months, Bierman told him that he could not commit to the project. Brooks told him that he understood and had freed him from his contract.

Cornfeld then heard that Cronenberg was no longer associated with Total Recall and re-approached him with The Fly. Cronenberg agreed to sign on as director if he would be allowed to rewrite the script.

 Pogue's draft

Geoff and Barbara Powell are a happily married couple. Geoff, a brilliant scientist, has been working on a teleportation machine, but is unwilling to tell his employer, Phillip DeWitt, or his friend, Harry Chandler, about the nature of the project. DeWitt is greatly displeased by this, and threatens to pull his funding of the mystery project unless he is given full disclosure. After several failed experiments, such as a monkey's atoms never reintegrating after disintegration, Geoff eventually is successful in teleporting both inanimate and living objects. However, when he tries it on himself, a housefly slips into the booth with him. Seemingly normal at first, Geoff soon develops incredible strength, stamina, and energy. After sprouting fly-hairs and losing his fingernails, Geoff eventually discovers that the fly has been absorbed into his body, and that its cells are now taking over his own.

As he slowly mutates into a giant fly, Geoff loses body parts, and becomes able to climb walls, as well as digest food with corrosive vomit. Barb is horrified to learn that she is pregnant by Geoff, and cannot be sure if the child was conceived before or after his teleportation. Eventually, Chandler discovers the teleporter's existence, reveals it to DeWitt, and demonstrates it on a cat, only to have the lost monkey atoms return from the ether and create a horrible "monkey-cat" creature, which DeWitt beats to death with a metal rod. Despite this failed experiment, DeWitt sees the substantial monetary value of the device, and so takes possession of the teleporter. Geoff (now mostly transformed into a fly-monster and unable to speak) learns of this, and goes to DeWitt's office building, followed by Barb. Geoff confronts DeWitt, starts a fire in the lab where the teleporter is now housed, and kills DeWitt by vomiting and feeding on him. He then traps himself in one of the teleportation booths just as Barb arrives to watch the fire kill him and destroy the teleporter—his intent all along. In a coma, Barb dreams of giving birth to a giant maggot, only to wake up in a hospital, where it is revealed that she's given birth to a healthy baby boy.

 Cronenberg's draft

The revised script differed greatly from Pogue's screenplay, though it still retained the basic plot and the central concept of a gradual mutation. Cronenberg rewrote the characters and most of the dialogue from scratch (as well as fusing DeWitt and Chandler--who had romantic intentions toward Barb in the Pogue draft--into Stathis Borans), and carried over a few key moments and concepts. Certain aspects of the transformation from Pogue's draft (such as the hero's loss of body parts) were expanded upon, and Cronenberg also layered in his trademark themes of sexuality, body horror, and personal identity. He also made it a point to keep Seth Brundle as articulate as possible for as long as possible, as opposed to Pogue's draft, in which Geoff Powell loses his ability to speak two-thirds of the way through the script.

Seth Brundle's increasing mania and personality changes in the early stages of the transformation were emphasized in the rewrites, and the notion of the transformation itself being a horrible (and very metaphorical) disease became a key factor in the new script. Also, in this version, Brundle was clearly transforming into a bizarre hybrid creature as the result of a genetic fusion, whereas in Pogue's version, Powell was being taken over by the fly's cells, which had been absorbed into his body (thus slowly transforming him literally into a giant fly, rather than Brundle's deformed man-fly mixture). Cronenberg's version also retained such moments as Brundle catching a fly in mid-air, the fingernail-pulling, and the maggot-baby dream (which was moved to an earlier point in the story, and used for thematic and plot purposes rather than as an end-of-film shock moment).

The "monkey-cat" of Pogue's script was repurposed by Cronenberg into a twisted, desperate attempt by Brundle to find a cure, and Pogue's sequence of a fly leg hatching from Geoff's side was taken one step further, with Brundle amputating the twitching limb with his teeth. Pogue's script also featured a bag lady being murdered by Geoff in an alley, and Cronenberg revised this so that the woman was killed by vomit-drop (as with DeWitt's murder at the end of the original draft) rather than Geoff cutting her throat accidentally (however, Cronenberg never filmed his version of this sequence, which was written out of the final shooting script). While Cronenberg's script did not end with Veronica Quaife giving birth, it did end with a coda which revealed that she was pregnant with a normal baby, conceived by Borans after Brundle's death (and the abortion of Brundle's possibly tainted fetus).

Despite the extensive rewrite of Pogue's script, Cronenberg insisted during Writers Guild arbitrations that he and Pogue share screenplay credit, since he felt that his version could not have come to pass without Pogue's script to serve as a foundation.

With a script that everyone approved of, Cronenberg assembled his usual crew and began the process of casting the picture. John Malkovich was the top choice for the role of Seth Brundle but he declined, John Lithgow was also offered the role of Seth Brundle but turned it down, stating it was too grotesque, Michael Keaton and Richard Dreyfuss were also considered; ultimately deciding on Jeff Goldblum and Geena Davis for the leads. Chris Walas, who had designed the creatures in Gremlins, was hired to handle the film's extensive special effects. Principal photography began on December 1, 1985, in Toronto.

The producers commissioned musician Bryan Ferry to record a song for the film for promotional purposes. The resulting track was "Help Me". A music video was made for the song, and footage from the film was prominently featured in it. Cronenberg admitted to liking the song, but he felt that it was inappropriate to the film itself. Brooks and Cornfeld originally wanted to play the song over the closing credits, but after Cronenberg screened it for them, they agreed with the director that it did not mesh with the movie. As a result, the song is featured only briefly in the film, in the background during the scene where Brundle challenges Marky in the bar. "Help Me" became rather obscure, as it was not included on the film's soundtrack release. The song resurfaced in 1993 on the Roxy Music/Bryan Ferry compact disc Ultimate Collection.

The design of Brundle's telepods was inspired by the engine cylinder of Cronenberg's Ducati Desmo motorcycle.

Deleted and alternate scenes
After filming ended early in 1986, a rough cut of The Fly was shown to Fox executives, who were very impressed. A rough cut was then previewed at Toronto's Uptown Theatre in the spring of that year. Due to a strong audience reaction, the graphic and infamous "monkey-cat" sequence was cut from the film to make it easier for audiences to maintain sympathy for Brundle's character. Another preview screening was subsequently held at the Fox lot in Los Angeles, and this version featured the "butterfly baby" coda. As before, the screening results dictated that the scene be cut.

Makeup and creature effects

The Academy Award-winning makeup was designed and executed by Chris Walas, Inc. over a period of three months. The final "Brundlefly" creature was designed first, and then the various steps needed to carry protagonist Seth Brundle to that final incarnation were designed. The transformation was intended to be a metaphor for the aging process. To that end, Brundle loses hair, teeth and fingernails, with his skin becoming more and more discolored and lumpy. The intention of the filmmakers was to give Brundle a bruised and cancerous look that gets progressively worse as the character's altered genome slowly asserts itself, with the final Brundlefly hybrid creature literally bursting out of Brundle's hideously deteriorated human skin. The creature itself was designed to appear horribly asymmetrical and deformed, and not at all a viable or robust organism.

Various looks were tested for the makeup effects. Some early test footage can be seen on the 2005 The Fly: Collector's Edition DVD, as well as the Blu-ray release.

The transformation was broken up into seven distinct stages, with Jeff Goldblum spending many hours in the makeup chair for Brundle's later incarnations.

 Stages 1 and 2: subtle, rash-like skin discoloration that leads to facial lesions and sores, with tiny fly hairs dotting Goldblum's face, in addition to the patch of fly hairs growing out of the wound on Brundle's back.
 Stages 3 and 4-A: piecemeal prosthetics covering Goldblum's face (and later his arms, feet, and torso), wigs with bald spots, and crooked, prosthetic teeth (beginning with stage 4-A).
 Stage 4-B: deleted from the film, this variant of stage 4 was seen only in the "monkey-cat" scene, and required Goldblum to wear the first of two full-body foam latex suits, as Brundle has stopped wearing clothing, at this point.
 Stage 5: the second full-body suit, with more exaggerated deformities, and which also required Goldblum to wear distorting contact lenses that made one eye look larger than the other.
 Stage 6: the final "Brundlefly" creature (referred to as the "space bug" by the film's crew), depicted by various partial and full-body cable- and rod-controlled puppets.
 Stage 7: another puppet which represented the mortally injured Brundlefly-Telepod fusion creature (initially dubbed the "Brundlebooth" and later the "Brundlething" by the crew) as seen in the film's final moments.

Music 
The score to The Fly was composed and conducted by Howard Shore, and performed by the London Philharmonic Orchestra. It was released on record, cassette, and Compact Disc (with three additional tracks exclusively included on the latter) by Varèse Sarabande, and in 2005, it was remastered and reissued on a two-disc set with Christopher Young's album for The Fly II.

Titles in bold are exclusive to the CD release. The soundtrack presents the music out of order from the movie's presentation.

 Main Title 1:54 
 Plasma Pool 1:54 
 The Last Visit 2:25 
 Stathis Enters 2:20 
 The Phone Call 2:07 
 Seth Goes Through 2:02 
 Ronnie Comes Back 0:55 
 The Jump 1:21 
 Seth and the Fly 2:21 
 Particle Magazine 1:02 
 The Armwrestle 0:51 
 Brundlefly 1:43 
 Ronnie's Visit 0:35 
 The Street 0:43 
 The Stairs 1:25 
 The Fingernails 2:35 
 Baboon Teleportation 0:58 
 The Creature 2:08 
 Steak Montage 0:59 
 The Maggot/Fly Graphic 1:37 
 Success With Baboon 0:58 
 The Ultimate Family 1:59 
 The Finale 2:51

Reception

Critical response
The Fly was critically acclaimed, with most praise going to Goldblum's performance and the special effects. Despite being a gory remake of a classic, and made by a controversial, non-mainstream director, the film was a commercial success, the biggest of Cronenberg's career, and was the top-grossing film in the United States for two weeks, earning a total domestic gross of $40,456,565. Audiences reacted strongly to the graphic creature effects and the tragic love story, and the film received much attention at the time of its release. Audiences polled by CinemaScore gave the film an average grade of "B" on an A+ to F scale.

Cronenberg was surprised when The Fly was seen by some critics as a cultural metaphor for AIDS, since he originally intended the film to be a more general analogy for disease itself, terminal conditions like cancer and, more specifically, the aging process:

Film critic Gene Siskel named The Fly as the tenth-best film of 1986. In 1989, Premiere and American Film magazines both conducted independent polls of American film critics, directors and other such groups to determine the best films of the 1980s, and The Fly appeared on both lists.

The Fly holds a 92% approval rating on Rotten Tomatoes based on 65 reviews, with an average rating of 8.40/10. The website's critical consensus reads, "David Cronenberg combines his trademark affinity for gore and horror with strongly developed characters, making The Fly a surprisingly affecting tragedy." In 2005, Time magazine film critics Richard Corliss and Richard Schickel included The Fly in their list of the All-TIME 100 Greatest Movies. Time later named it one of the 25 best horror films. The film was ranked #33 on Bravo's 100 Scariest Movie Moments. Similarly, the Chicago Film Critics Association named The Fly the 32nd scariest film ever made. In 2021, The Daily Star ranked The Fly at the top of its list of greatest short story adaptations, praising the film for "exhibit[ing] how greater a short story can evolve, and very much become its own detached, barely recognisable thing."

Accolades

The Fly was nominated for the awards in the chart below. Many genre fans and film critics at the time thought that Jeff Goldblum's performance would receive a Best Actor Oscar nomination, but this did not happen. Gene Siskel subsequently stated that Goldblum most likely "got stiffed" out of a nomination because the older Academy voters generally do not honor horror films.

Year-end lists
In 2008, the American Film Institute distributed ballots to 1,500 directors, critics and other people associated with the film industry in order to determine the top ten American films in ten different genre categories. Cronenberg's version of The Fly was nominated under the science fiction category, although it did not make the top ten. It was also nominated for AFI's 100 Years... 100 Thrills and AFI's 100 Years...100 Passions and Veronica's warning to Tawny in the film—"Be afraid. Be very afraid."—was nominated for AFI's 100 Years... 100 Movie Quotes.

The quote "Be afraid. Be very afraid." was also used as the film's marketing tagline, and this became so ingrained in popular culture (as it—and variants—have appeared in countless films and TV series) that many people who are familiar with the phrase are unaware that it originated in The Fly.

Legacy
On October 10, 2020, the film was referenced in a Saturday Night Live sketch regarding the 2020 vice presidential debate. Jim Carrey provided an impression of Jeff Goldblum.

Heavy metal band Ice Nine Kills released "F.L.Y" as part of their 2021 album The Silver Scream 2: Welcome to Horrorwood. The song is inspired by the 1986 film.

Other media

Sequel

Whereas the 1958 original was followed by two sequels, Cronenberg has said that the stories in his films have definitive beginnings and endings, and he has never considered making a sequel to one of his own films, although others have made sequels to Cronenberg films, including Scanners (1981).

The Fly II (1989) was directed by Chris Walas, the man behind the makeup and creature effects of both films and Gremlins. It is a direct continuation of The Fly. It features Veronica Quaife giving birth to Brundle's mutant son before dying, and it focuses on the Bartok company's attempts to get the Telepods working again.

David Cronenberg was not involved with the project. The only actor to return for the sequel was John Getz as an embittered Stathis Borans. Veronica Quaife appears briefly in the film. She is played by Saffron Henderson, since Geena Davis declined to reprise the role. Jeff Goldblum appears in archival footage of Seth Brundle in two scenes, including the post-teleportation interview segment that was deleted from the first film.

An early treatment for a sequel, written by Tim Lucas, involved Veronica Quaife dealing with the evils of the Bartok company. Brundle's consciousness had somehow survived within the Telepod computer, and the Bartok scientists had enslaved him and were using him to develop the system for cloning purposes. Brundle becomes able to communicate with Veronica through the computer, and he eventually takes control of the Bartok complex's security systems to gruesomely attack the villains. Eventually, Veronica frees Brundle by conspiring with him to reintegrate a non-contaminated version of his original body. Cronenberg endorsed this concept at the time. Geena Davis was open to doing a sequel (and only pulled out of The Fly II because her character was to be killed in the opening scene), while Goldblum was not (although he determined a cameo appearance was acceptable), and this treatment reflects that. However, a later treatment written by Jim and Ken Wheat was used as the basis for the final script, written by Frank Darabont. Mick Garris also wrote a treatment, with elements incorporated into the final film.

Comic books
Beginning in March 2015 IDW Publishing released The Fly: Outbreak, a five-issue comic book miniseries written by Brandon Seifert. The story is a direct sequel to the events of The Fly II, and features Seth Brundle's son, Martin, inadvertently causing a transgenic outbreak while attempting to cure Anton Bartok, to whom he'd previously transferred his mutant genes at the end of The Fly II.

Canceled projects

Renny Harlin's alternate sequel 
In the 1990s, Geena Davis was reportedly involved with an alternate sequel to The Fly, to be directed by her then-husband, Renny Harlin, titled Flies. The script by Richard Jefferies was said to feature a story in which Veronica gives birth to twin boys, and she survives the ordeal.

Todd Lincoln's second remake 
In 2003, it was announced that a second remake of The Fly was being developed, to be directed by Todd Lincoln, produced by Fox Searchlight Pictures, and released in 2006, but this did not happen.

David Cronenberg's sequel 
In 2009, it was rumored that David Cronenberg himself was preparing to direct a second remake of The Fly, but it was not until 2011 that the director addressed the rumors. Cronenberg stated that he had written not a remake, but rather a "sort of" sequel script to his 1986 version, and would film it if 20th Century Fox gave the project the go-ahead: 

Cronenberg elaborated further when interviewed by Empire in 2012: 

In a late 2012 interview, Cronenberg provided additional details on why the project had stalled, citing 
 He also described the project as "more of a sequel or a sidebar. It was a meditation on fly-ness. None of the same characters or anything and, of course, with an understanding of modern technology."

Despite Cronenberg's prior assertions that he does not make sequels to his films, he returned to The Fly for the opera The Fly in 2008, and his proposed sequel film project would mark a second return to the material, as well as his first sequel to one of his previous movies. However, the film is not moving forward.

On June 15, 2018, Jeff Goldblum said he would be interested in doing a sequel only if Cronenberg was involved, even though his character died. “I don’t think my character would be involved because of course I got tragically mutated with the fly and then the machine, oh boy. But maybe I show up as a grandchild of the original Seth Brundle, or Seth Brundle had a brother. Had a brother that emerges in some ways! Who knows, I don’t know but David Cronenberg was a thrill to work with. Boy, if he was involved I’d like to work with him again, I’ll tell you that.”

References

External links 

 
 
 
 
 

1986 films
1986 horror films
1980s monster movies
1986 romantic drama films
1980s science fiction horror films
20th Century Fox films
American body horror films
Remakes of American films
American monster movies
American romantic drama films
American romantic horror films
American science fiction horror films
Brooksfilms films
1980s English-language films
Films about genetic engineering
Films about shapeshifting
Films adapted into operas
Films based on short fiction
Films directed by David Cronenberg
Films produced by Mel Brooks
Films scored by Howard Shore
Films that won the Academy Award for Best Makeup
Horror film remakes
Mad scientist films
American science fiction drama films
Teleportation in films
The Fly (franchise)
Films set in Toronto
Films with screenplays by Charles Edward Pogue
Films shot in Toronto
1980s American films